Avangardnoye is a rural locality (a settlement) in Kutuzovskoye Rural Settlement of Guryevsky District, Kaliningrad Oblast, Russia. The population was 159 as of 2010. There are 18 streets.

Geography 
Avangardnoye is located 7 km southeast of Guryevsk (the district's administrative centre) by road. Cheryomkhovo is the nearest rural locality.

References 

Rural localities in Kaliningrad Oblast
Populated places in Guryevsky District, Kaliningrad Oblast